Martín Nicolás Benítez (born 17 June 1994) is an Argentine professional footballer who plays as an attacking midfielder for Brazilian club América Mineiro.

Club career
Benítez began playing football in his home town team called The Picada. He caught the eye of Boca Juniors who offered a trial that never materialized.

As a result, Benitez quit football because of depression. He was encouraged back into football by his family and Independiente called him up for a trial in 2009.

He travelled to the Netherlands with the reserve team to play a friendly against Ajax. Although the team lost 5-1, he scored the only goal against goalkeeper Kenneth Vermeer.

On October 13, 2011 he was called up to the first team by coach Ramón Díaz.

His debut came on November 19, when Independiente defeated Club Olimpo 3-0 playing the last twenty minutes of the match. His debut goal came on December 4, 2011 against Newell's Old Boys in a 1-1 draw.

His second goal via a header came on December 8, 2011 against San Lorenzo de Almagro.

International career
He has made 7 appearances with Argentina U-17 team scoring twice, participating in two tournaments.
 
 2011 South American U-17 Football Championship
 2011 FIFA U-17 World Cup

Honors
Independiente
Copa Sudamericana: 2017

São Paulo
Campeonato Paulista: 2021

Grêmio
Campeonato Gaúcho: 2022
Recopa Gaúcha: 2022

References

External links

1994 births
Living people
Argentine footballers
Argentina youth international footballers
Club Atlético Independiente footballers
CR Vasco da Gama players
São Paulo FC players
Grêmio Foot-Ball Porto Alegrense players
América Futebol Clube (MG) players
Argentine Primera División players
Campeonato Brasileiro Série A players
Campeonato Brasileiro Série B players
Association football forwards
Argentine expatriate footballers
Expatriate footballers in Brazil
Argentine expatriate sportspeople in Brazil
People from Posadas, Misiones
Sportspeople from Misiones Province